The NWA Tennessee Heavyweight Championship was the primary championship in the National Wrestling Alliance territory promotion NWA Top Rope, based in Lebanon, Tennessee. The Championship was created in 2005 and was active until 2013 when NWA Top Rope closed. That version of the championship was preceded by the original NWA Tennessee Heavyweight Championship that existed from the late 1950s into the 1960s, promoted by NWA Mid-America. Because the championship is a professional wrestling championship, it is not won or lost competitively but instead by the decision of the bookers of a wrestling promotion. The championship is awarded after the chosen wrestler "wins" a match to maintain the illusion that professional wrestling is a competitive sport.

Title history

NWA Mid-America

Continental Championship Wrestling / USA Championship Wrestling

NWA Top Rope

See also
List of National Wrestling Alliance championships

Footnotes

References

External links
Wrestling-Titles.com
NWA Top Rope

National Wrestling Alliance championships
National Wrestling Alliance state wrestling championships
NWA Mid-America championships
Professional wrestling in Tennessee